Crvena Jabuka is the first studio album by Sarajevo-based Bosnian band Crvena Jabuka. It was recorded in January and February 1986, and the official release was 22 March 1986.

This album was the first (and only) album to have the band in its original lineup. Many of the songs on this album were written by Zlatko Arslanagić.

After the release of their self-titled debut album, Crvena Jabuka was supposed to go on a concert on 18 September 1986. The concert never happened since two members of the band were involved in a serious car crash near Jablanica that claimed the life of bass player Aljoša Buha at the scene, as well as guitarist and vocalist Dražen Ričl (who died in a hospital nearly two weeks later from the injuries.)

This was the album where the band's logo was derived. On the photo on the album we see a naked woman with a red apple painted across her buttocks. Subsequent albums always had a red apple put in some fashion for example Sanjati showed a man holding a red apple. The only two albums that didn't have the red apple were Nekako s proljeća and U tvojim očima.

Track listing

Personnel
Dražen Ričl – guitar, vocals
Zlatko Arslanagić – rhythm guitar
Darko Jelčić – drums, percussion
Aljoša Buha – bass guitar
Dražen Žerić – piano, organ, keyboards, vocals

References

1986 debut albums
Crvena jabuka albums
New Primitivism